Franz Bi (2 April 1899 – 25 December 1968) was a German art director. He worked on the set design of more than forty films during his career, often in collaboration with Bruno Monden.

Selected filmography
 The Rainer Case (1942)
 The Golden Spider (1943)
 Beloved Darling (1943)
 When the Young Wine Blossoms (1943)
 A Man Like Maximilian (1945)
 In the Temple of Venus (1948)
 Chased by the Devil (1950)
 The Man Who Wanted to Live Twice (1950)
 Five Suspects (1950)
 Fanfares of Love (1951)
 The Blue and White Lion (1952)
 House of Life (1952)
 The Great Temptation (1952)
 Street Serenade (1953)
 A Heart Plays False (1953)
 The Eternal Waltz (1954)
 A Woman of Today (1954)
 André and Ursula (1955)
 San Salvatore (1956)
 A Piece of Heaven (1957)
 Restless Night (1958)
 A Summer You Will Never Forget (1959)
 People in the Net (1959)
 Conny and Peter Make Music (1960)
 Agatha, Stop That Murdering! (1960)

References

Bibliography 
 Giesen, Rolf.  Nazi Propaganda Films: A History and Filmography. McFarland, 2003.

External links 
 

1899 births
1968 deaths
Film people from Berlin
German art directors